"When Mama Ain't Happy" is a song recorded by American country music artist Tracy Byrd.  It was released in December 1998 as the first single from his Keepers: Greatest Hits compilation album.  The song reached #31 on the Billboard Hot Country Singles & Tracks chart.  The song was written by Tim Nichols, Rick Giles and Gilles Godard.

Chart performance

References

1998 singles
1998 songs
Tracy Byrd songs
Songs written by Rick Giles
Songs written by Tim Nichols
Song recordings produced by Tony Brown (record producer)
MCA Nashville Records singles